Ken Nwadiogbu (popularly known as KenArt) is a Nigerian-born London-based multidisciplinary artist. He calls his method contemporealism – a fusion that is primarily centred on hyper-realism and contemporary art. In 2019, He was awarded the prestigious The Future Awards Africa and was named by Guardian Life as one of the most "Outstanding Personalities of 2019".

Early life and education
Kenechukwu Nwadiogbu did not set out to become an artist. He had initially wanted to study civil engineering.

As he developed in his drawing, his fame among his small circle grew and the encouragement from his friends spurred him on.

Nwadiogbu attended the University of Lagos, where he studied Civil and Environmental Engineering. His journey with art began in this university, and despite having no formal training, he has pushed to become an interesting contemporary artist from Nigeria.

Style of art
According to an interview with Juxtapoz Magazine, Nwadiogbu responds on canvas to socio-political structures and issues around him and the world. Through meticulous hyperrealist technique, he constructs arresting images rich with deft use of form and space. Cleverly, his paintings regularly feature obscure portraits of everyday people peeking through the ripped paper, elevating and situating Africans in the global context. Weighty issues like gender equality, African cultures, global politics, Black power, and most recently knife-crime come to the conversation by way of his mind-boggling technique. Working with charcoal, pencil, and acrylic, Nwadiogbu aims to achieve a deeper meaning through his art, one which goes beyond the visually spectacular facade he presents into different themes.

His art is inspired by social movements and principles while evaluating, interrogating and challenging socio-political structures and issues within society. He perceives his art as a response to society and a way to inspire one or two people to re-evaluate their socio-political structures.

Journey Mercies
As the UK recently announced in a dramatic statement the outsourcing of asylum seekers to Rwanda for processing, migration took the light once again as a serious, and challenging matter of concern on the global stage. Nwadiogbu's most recent work critically addresses this sensitive subject, inviting us to embrace new perspectives. Using personified cardboard boxes as vivid metaphors of black migrants, he plays around with the parcels' disposable nature, underlining the dehumanisation process at work in the migration politics. Like boxes, black bodies used to be stacked up in ships and traded oversea. A paradox Nwadiogbu interrogates in his installation "Journey Mercies", in dramatic staging, and collective play-out.

Journey Mercies is a three-dimensional visual metaphor for these migratory souls. Painted in vibrant colours, the boxes combine in a way that references traditional African woven fabrics, commenting on the richness and the strength of this culture on the move.

The title of the project references the Nigerian custom of prayers said on behalf of someone who is about to undertake a long journey. The expression has its origins in the late 19th century when it referred to the prayers for missionaries who were travelling to remote parts of the world. For the artist, the phrase is something that sums up his experience of travelling, something that comes with a sense of trepidation but that is also tinged with hope and excitement.

Awards and residencies
2019: The Future Awards Africa Prize for Art (Visual/Applied).
2021: The Bomb Factory Art Residency.

Exhibitions
 2016, Insanity- Sponsored by Frot Foundation. Held at Omenka Gallery, Ikoyi, Lagos, Nigeria.
 2017, It's Not Furniture - Sponsored by Temple Management Company. Held at Omenka Gallery, Ikoyi, Lagos, Nigeria.
 2017, Finding your Identity - Sponsored by ENACOF. Held at British Council, Abuja, Nigeria.
 2017, ARTYRAMA Art Exhibition- Curated by Jess Castellote. Held at Alhaji Bashorun, Ikoyi, Lagos, Nigeria.
 2018, EMPOWERMENT Exhibition - By Creative Debuts and Nasty Women NYC. Held at Black and White Building, Rivington Street, London.
 2018, Generation Y- A Contemporary Art Exhibition by Retro Africa. Held at The Exhibition Pavilion, Abuja, Nigeria.
 2018, Moniker Art Fair- A Contemporary Art Fair sponsored by Creative Debuts and held at Greenpoint Terminal Warehouse, Brooklyn, NYC.
 2018, Anti Trump Art Show- A contemporary art show about the "dangerous racism, sexism and narcissism that flow daily from the White House2, held at the July Rivington Studios, 1 Bath Place, Shoreditch, London.
 2018, Afriuture Exhibition- By Ramati Art Africa in association with the Commonwealth Africa Summit. Held at the Ontario Investment and Trade Centre, Toronto, Canada.
 2018, Art X Lagos- First International Contemporary Art Fair in West Africa held at Federal Palace, Lagos, Nigeria.
 2019, LAX-SFO- A group exhibition held at Heron Arts, San Francisco, California.
 2019, IN THE MAKING- A Contemporary Art Exhibition held at Retro Africa Gallery, Abuja, Nigeria.
 2019, LAX-MSY- A group exhibition held at Red Truck Gallery, New Orleans, Louisiana.
 2019, LAX-LHR- Co-Curated Exhibition with Stolen Space held at Osborn Street, London.
 2019, Art X Lagos- International Contemporary Art Fair in West Africa held at Federal Palace, Lagos, Nigeria.
 2019, Moniker Art Fair- A Contemporary Art Fair held at The Chelsea Sorting Office, Chelsea, London.
 2019, CONTEMPOREALISM Solo show- The debut International Solo Show by Ken Nwadiogbu held in Brick Lane Gallery, London.
 2019, Miami Art Week- A Contemporary Art Exhibition held in The Citadel, Miami, FL.
 2020, ART OF DIVERSITY- A Contemporary Art Exhibition featuring winners of the Bridgeman Award, held in Yinka Sonibare CBE RA studio, London.
 2020, 1-54 African Art Fair New York- A leading international art fair dedicated to contemporary art from Africa and its diaspora.

References

Living people
Nigerian artists
University of Lagos alumni
Year of birth missing (living people)